Powellisetia is a genus of minute sea snails, marine gastropod mollusks or micromollusks in the family Rissoidae.

Species
Species within the genus Powellisetia include:
 Powellisetia australis (Watson, 1886)
 Powellisetia bilirata Ponder, 1965
 Powellisetia comes (Finlay, 1926)†
 Powellisetia crassilabrum (Powell, 1940)
 Powellisetia deserta (Smith, 1907)
 Powellisetia fallax Kay, 1979
 Powellisetia gradata (Suter, 1908)
 Powellisetia helena (Turton, 1932)
 Powellisetia inornata (Strebel, 1908)
 Powellisetia lineata (E. C. Smith, 1962)
 Powellisetia microlirata Ponder & Worsfold, 1994
 Powellisetia microstriata (Murdoch, 1905)
 Powellisetia paroeca (Finlay, 1924)†
 Powellisetia pelseneeri (Thiele, 1912)
 Powellisetia philomelae (Watson, 1886)
 Powellisetia ponderi Numanami, 1996
 Powellisetia porcellana (Suter, 1908)
 Powellisetia porcellanoides (Powell, 1937)
 Powellisetia principis (Watson, 1886)
 Powellisetia retusa (Powell, 1927)
 Powellisetia simillima (May, 1915)
 Powellisetia subgradata (Powell, 1937)
 Powellisetia subtenuis (Powell, 1937)
 Powellisetia tenuisculpta (Powell, 1933)
 Powellisetia unicarinata (Powell, 1930)

References

 page(s): 61-62 Ponder W. F. (1985). A review of the Genera of the Rissoidae (Mollusca: Mesogastropoda: Rissoacea). Records of the Australian Museum supplement 4: 1-221
 Spencer, H.; Marshall. B. (2009). All Mollusca except Opisthobranchia. In: Gordon, D. (Ed.) (2009). New Zealand Inventory of Biodiversity. Volume One: Kingdom Animalia. 584 pp

Rissoidae
Taxa named by Winston Ponder